Francis J. McNeil (born 1932) was an American ambassador to Costa Rica from 1980 to 1983.

References

1932 births
Living people
Ambassadors of the United States to Costa Rica